Culpa, sometimes referred to as Molina's Culpa, is a 1993 film directed by Cuban film director Jorge Molina.  It is a black-and-white film that pioneered a postmodern use of Noir, blood, gore and pornography genres in Cuba. It tells the story of a priest and a prostitute who start a relationship while a serial killer is on the loose. It was Jorge Molina's thesis while studying at the EICTV (Escuela Internacional de Cine y TV de San Antonio de los Baños).

External links

 

1993 films
Cuban comedy films
1990s Spanish-language films
Cuban short films